Emile Jacotey is the fourth album by the French progressive rock band Ange, released in 1975.

Track listing
"Bêle, bêle petite chèvre"  – 3:50
"Sur la trace des fées"  – 4:48
"Le Nain de Stanislas"  – 5:45
"Jour après jour"  – 3:09
"Ode à Emile"  – 3:03
"Ego et Deus" - 17:40
 "Ego et Deus"  – 4:07
 "J'irai dormir plus loin que ton sommeil"  – 4:11
 "Aurélia"  – 2:54
 "Les Noces"  – 6:28
"Le Marchand de planètes"  – 4:17

Personnel 
Guenole Biger – percussions, drums, electric guitar on "Jour après jour", marimba on "Bêle, bêle petite chèvre", vibraphone on "Ode à Emile"
Jean Michel Brezovar – electric guitar, vocals
Christian Décamps  – percussions, keyboards, vocals
Francis Decamps – organ, synthesizer, piano, vocals
Daniel Haas – acoustic guitar, bass, guitar

Release history

References

External links
Angemusic 

Ange albums
1975 albums